"Eazy" is a song by American rappers The Game and Kanye West. It was released as a single on January 16, 2022. The song was released exclusively on Spotify two days before. The cover art for the single attracted controversy due to the featuring of Nick Knight's highly graphic 1997 photo of a skinned monkey and the song's music video attracted controversy because of its depiction of West burying alive comedian Pete Davidson, who was dating his ex-wife Kim Kardashian.

Background and marketing
On January 12, 2022, in an Instagram video shared by designer Tracey Mills, West was seen talking to DJ Premier on FaceTime with the Game and fellow collaborators Pusha T and Mike Dean in the studio. In the video, West said that he was releasing a song that Friday and was asking DJ Premier if he could do a scratch for the song. On January 15, 2022, the song was released exclusively on Spotify before being added to other streaming platforms a day later.

Cover art
On January 14, 2022, West revealed the cover art for the single on Instagram and captioned the post, "My life was never eazy". The cover depicts a skinned monkey against a blood red background. The picture was originally taken by English photographer and frequent West collaborator Nick Knight in 1997 as part of his research for the War editorial for Big Magazine, which he described as "a study in physiology, form, philosophy, and death". The picture of the skinned monkey was not published until 2013, when Knight curated a series of research imagery for SHOWstudio. Speaking about the picture, Knight said in 2013:

Animal rights organization PETA commented on the cover, saying that it is "reminiscent of monkeys PETA has found" and that "when you remove the fur, you can't miss that there's a person in there, that they are fellow primates, and do not belong to us to abuse for any purpose".

Music videos
A music video of the song premiered via Instagram on March 2, 2022. The video is half claymation and half live-action. The video has been heavily criticized as it depicts West kidnapping, burying alive, and decapitating Pete Davidson, referencing West's divorce with Kim Kardashian. In response to the controversy, West posted on Instagram that "Art is not a proxy for any ill or harm, Any suggestion otherwise about my art is false and mal intended." On March 9, 2022, a second music video with CGI animated visuals was released.

Credits
 Production – Hit-Boy, Mike Dean, Big Duke, Cash Jones
 Scratches – DJ Premier
 Vocals – The Game, Kanye West, Julia Fox (background)

Charts

References

2022 singles
2022 songs
The Game (rapper) songs
Kanye West songs
Music video controversies
Obscenity controversies in music
Song recordings produced by Hit-Boy
Song recordings produced by DJ Premier
Song recordings produced by Mike Dean (record producer)